1996 J.League Cup Final was the 4th final of the J.League Cup competition. The final was played at National Stadium in Tokyo on September 25, 1996. Shimizu S-Pulse won the championship.

Match details

See also
1996 J.League Cup

References

J.League Cup
1996 in Japanese football
Shimizu S-Pulse matches
Tokyo Verdy matches
J.League Cup Final 1996